La Varenne is a former commune in the Maine-et-Loire department in western France. On 15 December 2015, it was merged into the new commune Orée-d'Anjou. Its population was 1,796 in 2019.

The inhabitants of the town of La Varenne are "Varennais, Varennaises".

Demography

See also
 Communes of the Maine-et-Loire département

References

External links

 La Varenne on the Maine-et-Loire Web site
 La Varenne on the Institut Géographique National Web site

Varenne